Carl Ratner (born April 17, 1943) is an American cultural psychologist. He is the Director of the Institute for Cultural Research and Education in the United States and an adjunct professor at the Universidad Autónoma del Estado de Morelos in Cuernavaca, Morelos, Mexico. He is a member of the International Association for Cross-Cultural Psychology. He is known for his theory of "macro cultural psychology", which is based on the works of Soviet psychologist Lev Vygotsky. He was a Fulbright Fellow at Jawaharlal Nehru University from 2006 to 2007.

References

External links

Profile at Social Psychology Network

University at Buffalo alumni
Living people
21st-century American psychologists
University of Wisconsin–Madison alumni
Humboldt State University faculty
1943 births
Academics from New York (state)
American emigrants to Mexico
Cultural psychologists
20th-century American psychologists